Sangod is a city and a municipality in Kota district in the Indian state of Rajasthan.Sangod is also a Legislative Assembly Bharat Singh Kundanpur is the Member of Legislative Assembly (MLA) from Sangod. Current SHO of sangod police station is Bharat Singh. Devki Nandan Rathore is Chairman of Municipal Corporation of Sangod.and the City sangod is named upon sanga gurjar who defeated  meens and jaats and name this city upon his name sangod for his victory

Geography
It has an average elevation of 256 metres (839 feet).

Demographics
 India census, Sangod had a population of 18,645. Males constitute 52% of the population and females 48%. Sangod has an average literacy rate of 64%, higher than the national average of 59.5%: male literacy is 76%, and female literacy is 52%. In Sangod, 17% of the population is under 6 years of age.

References

Cities and towns in Kota district